Fred A. Dennett (May 19, 1849 – May 11, 1920) was an American politician and businessman.

Born in Greenville Piscataquis County, Maine, Dennett moved with his family and settled in Sheboygan, Wisconsin and then Sheboygan Falls, Wisconsin. He was educated in the public schools in Sheboygan Falls, Wisconsin and at Bryant, Stratton, &  Spencer Commercial College in Milwaukee, Wisconsin. He was involved in the manufacturing industry including reapers, mowers, and furniture. Dennett started the Wisconsin Chair Company in 1888, in 1888. He also served as a clerk in both houses of the Wisconsin Legislature. At the time of his death, Dennett was head of the United Photographs Corporation, From 1897 to 1901, Dennett served in the Wisconsin State Senate and was a Republican. From 1903 to 1905, Denning also served as Mayor of Sheboygan, Wisconsin. Dennett died suddenly in Grafton, Wisconsin.

Notes

1849 births
1920 deaths
People from Greenville, Maine
People from Ozaukee County, Wisconsin
Businesspeople from Wisconsin
Mayors of Sheboygan, Wisconsin
Republican Party Wisconsin state senators
People from Sheboygan Falls, Wisconsin